Qasim Mitchell (born December 3, 1979) is a former American football offensive lineman. He was originally signed by the Cleveland Browns as an undrafted free agent in 2002. He played college football at North Carolina A&T.

Mitchell was also a member of the Chicago Bears, Carolina Panthers, Arizona Cardinals, and San Francisco 49ers.

He now coaches at Jacksonville High-school, Jacksonville, North Carolina.

College career
Mitchell attended North Carolina A&T State University and starred in football. As a senior, he was a Sheridan Broadcasting Network Black College All-American selection, won All-Mideastern Athletic Conference first-team honors, and was named the Conference Lineman of the Year.

External links
Just Sports Stats
San Francisco 49ers bio
Jacksonville Sharks Bio

1979 births
Living people
American football offensive guards
American football offensive tackles
North Carolina A&T Aggies football players
Cleveland Browns players
Chicago Bears players
Frankfurt Galaxy players
Carolina Panthers players
Arizona Cardinals players
San Francisco 49ers players
Lehigh Valley Steelhawks players
Jacksonville Sharks players
People from Jacksonville, North Carolina